Zig-Zag Walk is the twelfth studio album by British hard rock band Foghat, released in 1983. Unlike the previous year's In the Mood for Something Rude, which consisted of all outside material, lead singer Dave Peverett wrote five of the album's ten songs, with guitarist Erik Cartwright contributing a sixth. A few of the songs are given a rockabilly treatment augmenting the blues rock the band is better known for. It would be the band's last album for over a decade until their comeback album, Return of the Boogie Men, in 1994.

Producer "Franz Leipkin" and keyboardist "Eli Jenkins" are pseudonyms for old bandmate Nick Jameson, who had played in Foghat in 1975 and produced or co-produced various Foghat albums in the  1970s and 1980s. Paul Butterfield makes a guest appearance on one song, playing harmonica on "Seven Day Weekend".

Track listing
"That's What Love Can Do" (Dave Peverett) – 3:54
"Zig-Zag Walk" (Peverett) – 3:28
"Choo Choo Ch'Boogie" (Denver Darling, Milt Gabler, Vaughn Horton) – 2:43
"Jenny Don't Mind" (Erik Cartwright) – 4:37
"Three Wheel Cadillac" (Peverett) – 3:55
"It'll Be Me" (Jack Clement) – 3:29
"Silent Treatment" (Peverett) – 3:17
"Down the Road a Piece" (Don Raye) – 2:35
"Seven Day Weekend" (Peverett) – 4:10
"Linda Lou" (Jon Jelmer) – 3:46

Personnel
Dave Peverett — lead and backing vocals, rhythm guitar
Erik Cartwright — lead guitar, slide guitar
Eli Jenkins — bass, backing vocals, keyboards
Roger Earl — drums

Charts

References

1983 albums
Foghat albums
Bearsville Records albums
Rhino Records albums